KCSW-LP (97.1 FM) was a radio station licensed to Canton, Missouri, United States. The station was owned by Culver-Stockton College. Its license expired February 1, 2021.

References

CSW-LP
CSW-LP
CSW-LP
Defunct radio stations in the United States
Radio stations disestablished in 2021
2021 disestablishments in Missouri
CSW-LP
Radio stations established in 2003
2003 establishments in Missouri